Quincy Railroad may refer to:
Quincy Railroad (California)
Quincy Railway or Granite Railway, a railway in Massachusetts

See also
Quincy Railroad Bridge, a bridge over the Mississippi River